Jack Graves Favor, also known as Cadillac Jack Favor, (November 30, 1911 – December 27, 1988) was an American rodeo performer.

Biography

Early life 
Favor was born on a ranch in Eula, Texas. He attended and graduated from Abilene High School. While at high school he won his first rodeo competition as a bronc rider in Cameron, Texas.

Later life 
Favor served in the United States Navy from 1929 to 1932, returning to Texas after his discharge. He worked as a truck driver for a plumbing company in Abilene, Texas. Favor later settled in Fort Worth, Texas, before returning to the Navy in 1941. 

Favor continued to compete in rodeos, retiring in 1961 to live Texarkana, Texas and work as a salesman.

Conviction, imprisonment and acquittal 

In 1967 Favor was convicted of a double murder after being accused by a hitchhiker he had picked up. He served eight years in Angola prison before being acquitted in a retrial.

After his release Favor was the subject of a book by William B. Moody titled In Jack’s Favor, and appeared on the late-night television talk show The Tomorrow Show and a radio show hosted by author, presenter and sports journalist, Howard Cosell.

Death 
Favor died in December 1988 of complications from cancer in a hospital in Arlington, Texas, at the age of 77. He was buried in Parkdale Cemetery.

Legacy 
In 1998 Favor was played by actor and musician Clint Black in the television film Still Holding On: The Legend of Cadillac Jack. Black also wrote a song titled "Cadillac Jack" with country guitarist and songwriter, Hayden Nicholas. Favor was posthumously inducted into the Texas Trail of Fame in 2009.

References

External links 
Jack Favor
Jack Favor - National Registry of Exonerations

1911 births
1988 deaths
People from Texas
Bronc riders
American truck drivers
American automobile salespeople
Abilene High School (Abilene, Texas) alumni
People convicted of murder by Louisiana
People acquitted of murder
Prison reformers
Deaths from cancer in Texas
Burials in Texas